Tanja Mejer Christensen (born 22 March 1985) is a Danish retired midfielder who played for Fortuna Hjørring and the Danish national team.

International career

Christensen was also part of the Danish team at the 2005 European Championships.

Honours
 'Danish League
 Champion'': 2009

References

1985 births
Living people
Fortuna Hjørring players
Danish women's footballers
Denmark women's international footballers
Women's association football forwards